The 1948 Missouri lieutenant gubernatorial election was held on November 2, 1948. Democratic nominee James T. Blair Jr. defeated Republican nominee George H. Miller with 57.83% of the vote.

Primary elections
Primary elections were held on August 3, 1948.

Republican primary

Candidates
George H. Miller, State Senator
Kirk Jones
William R. Orthwein
Charles L. Madison, State Senator
Adrian L. Bushman

Results

General election

Candidates
Major party candidates
James T. Blair Jr., Democratic
George H. Miller, Republican

Other candidates
Julius B. Jones, Progressive
Vernon M. Schroeder, Socialist

Results

References

1948
Gubernatorial
Missouri